Jonon may refer to:

 Jinong, a title of the Mongols
 Ionone, a ketone found in violets that contributes to their fragrance
 Jonon Bobokalonova (1929–2005), Tajikistani writer, literary critic, and academic